Moritz Albrecht Franz Friedrich Fedor von Bock (3 December 1880 – 4 May 1945) was a German  who served in the German Army during the Second World War. Bock served as the commander of Army Group North during the Invasion of Poland in 1939, commander of Army Group B during the Invasion of France in 1940, and later as the commander of Army Group Center during the attack on the Soviet Union in 1941; his final command was that of Army Group South in 1942.

Bock commanded Operation Typhoon, the ultimately failed attempt to capture Moscow during the autumn and winter of 1941. The Soviet counteroffensive soon drove the German army into retreat, and Bock was subsequently relieved of command by Adolf Hitler.

A monarchist, Bock was not heavily involved in politics. He did not sympathize with plots to overthrow Adolf Hitler, and never filed protests over the treatment of civilians by the SS and his own troops. Bock was also uncommonly outspoken, a privilege Hitler extended to him only because he had been successful in battle. Bock, his second wife and his stepdaughter were killed by a strafing Royal New Zealand Air Force fighter-bomber on 4 May 1945 as they traveled by car towards Hamburg.

Early life and World War I

Fedor von Bock was born into an old Prussian military family in Cüstrin, Germany (now Kostrzyn, Poland), a fortress city on the banks of the Oder River in the Province of Brandenburg.

His father, Moritz Albert Karl von Bock, had commanded a division in the Franco-Prussian War of 1870–1871. His mother, Olga Helene Franziska von Falkenhayn, was the sister of Erich von Falkenhayn, Chief of the German General Staff during the First World War. At the age of eight, Bock went to study at a military academy in Berlin. The education emphasized Prussian militarism, and he quickly became adept in academic subjects such as modern languages, mathematics, and history. He spoke fluent French, and some English and Russian. At an early age, and largely due to his father, Bock developed an unquestioning loyalty to the state and dedication to the military profession.

While not a brilliant theoretician, Bock was a highly motivated officer. As one of the highest-ranking officers in the Reichswehr, he often addressed graduating cadets at his alma mater, which closed in 1920. His theme was always that the greatest glory that could come to a German soldier was to die for the Fatherland. He quickly earned the nickname "Holy Fire of Küstrin".

In 1905, Bock married Mally von Reichenbach (1887–1910), a young Prussian noblewoman. They had a daughter. In 1908, Bock entered the War Academy in Berlin, and after a year's study he joined the ranks of the General Staff. He soon joined the Army League (Deutscher Wehrverein) and came to know Walther von Brauchitsch, Franz Halder, and Gerd von Rundstedt. By the time World War I began in 1914, Bock was a captain; he served as a battalion commander in January and February 1916. He was decorated with Pour le Mérite, German Empire's highest military decoration.

Inter-war period
Bock stayed on as an officer of the post-war Reichswehr, and rose through the ranks. In the 1920s, Bock was together with Kurt von Schleicher, Eugen Ott, and Kurt von Hammerstein-Equord a member of a secret group known as Sondergruppe R, selected by and responsible to Hans von Seeckt, who were in charge of helping Germany evade the Part V of the Treaty of Versailles, which had disarmed Germany.

The officers of Sondergruppe R formed the liaison with Major Bruno Ernst Buchrucker, who led the so-called Arbeits-Kommandos (Work Commandos), which was officially a labor group intended to assist with civilian projects, but were in reality thinly disguised soldiers that allowed Germany to exceed the limits on troop strength set by Versailles. Buchrucker's so-called "Black Reichswehr" became infamous for its practice of murdering all those Germans who were suspected of working as informers for the Allied Control Commission, which was responsible for ensuring that Germany was in compliance with Part V.

The killings perpetrated by the "Black Reichswehr" were justified under the so-called Femegerichte (secret court) system. These killings were ordered by the officers from Sondergruppe R. Regarding the Femegerichte murders, Carl von Ossietzky wrote: "Lieutenant Schulz (charged with the murder of informers against the "Black Reichswehr") did nothing but carry out the orders given him, and that certainly Colonel von Bock, and probably Colonel von Schleicher and General Seeckt, should be sitting in the dock beside him".

Several times Bock perjured himself in court when he denied that the Reichswehr had had anything to do with the "Black Reichswehr" or the murders they had committed.

On 27 September 1923, Buchrucker ordered 4,500 men of the Black Reichswehr to assemble outside of Berlin as the first preparatory step toward a coup. Bock, who was Buchrucker's contact with the Reichswehr, was enraged, and in a stormy meeting berated Buchrucker for mobilizing the Black Reichswehr without orders.

Bock stated the Reichswehr wanted no part in Buchrucker's coup and that "If Seeckt knew you were here, he would screw his monocle into his eye and say "Go for him!"". Despite Bock's orders to demobilize at once, Buchrucker went ahead with his coup on 30 September 1923, which ended in total failure.

In 1935, Adolf Hitler appointed Bock as commander of the Third Army Group. Bock was one of the officers not removed from his position when Hitler reorganized the armed forces during the phase of German rearmament before the outbreak of the Second World War. He remained a monarchist. Hitler reportedly said of him, "Nobody in the world but Bock can teach soldiers to die." In 1936 Bock married Wilhelmine, née von Boddien (1893–1945).

Bock commanded the invasion of Vienna in March 1938 for the Anschluss and then the Invasion of Czechoslovakia.

World War II

Invasion of Poland
By 25 August 1939, Bock was in command of Army Group North in preparation for the invasion and conquest of Poland. The objective of Army Group North was to destroy the Polish forces north of the Vistula. Army Group North was composed of General Georg von Küchler's 3rd Army, and General Günther von Kluge's 4th Army. These struck southward from East Prussia and eastward across the base of the Polish Corridor, respectively.

On 10 September Bock ordered the forces under his command to burn Polish villages located behind the front line to the ground if they were fired upon from the settlement and "if it proves impossible to identify the house from which the shots came". By the end of the military occupation of the country on 26 October 1939 531 towns and villages had been destroyed across Poland. In five weeks, Poland was overrun by German and Soviet forces.

Invasion of France

Shortly after the conquest of Poland, on 12 October 1939 Bock was given command of Army Group B, with 29½ divisions, including three armoured divisions. These were tasked with advancing through the Low Countries and luring the northern units of the Allied armies into a pocket. Army Group B consisted of the 18th and 6th Armies. While his units were overrunning the Netherlands, in May 1940, Bock attempted to call on the exiled former Kaiser—Wilhelm II—at Doorn, but Bock was unable to gain admittance, the German troops guarding the residence having been instructed to prevent such visits.

Bock participated in the Armistice with France in late June 1940.

On 19 July 1940, Bock was promoted to the rank of field marshal during the 1940 Field Marshal Ceremony. At the end of August, Army High Command transferred Army Group B to East Prussia; this included Kluge's 4th Army. On 11 September, Bock relinquished command of his occupation area in France to Field Marshal Wilhelm Ritter von Leeb.

Invasion of the Soviet Union

On 2 February, Bock met with Hitler and questioned whether the Russians could be forced to make peace even if the Red Army was brought to battle and defeated. Hitler airily assured Bock that Germany's resources were more than sufficient and that he was determined to fight. In preparation for Operation Barbarossa, on 1 April 1941 Army Group B was re-designated as Army Group Center. Deployed in Poland, Army Group Center was one of the three army formations which were to lead the invasion of the Soviet Union. It included the 4th and 9th Armies, the 3rd and 2nd Panzer Armies and Luftflotte 2. On the left flank of Bock's Army Group Center was Army Group North, commanded by Wilhelm Ritter von Leeb; on the right flank was Army Group South, commanded by Gerd von Rundstedt.

The main objective of Army Group Center was to follow the route north of the Pripyat Marshes to Moscow. Following the border battles, the task of Army Group Center was to drive towards the cities of Minsk and Smolensk, and destroy the Soviet armies stationed there in encirclement battles.

At 03:15 on 22 June 1941, the first shots of Operation Barbarossa were fired; Germany invaded the Soviet Union with a timed declaration of war.

Elements of Heinz Guderian's force had crossed the Bug River and were bypassing the city of Brest-Litovsk. Hermann Hoth's tanks were heading for Grodno on the Nieman River to seize the important river crossings. Several reconnaissance units from the 4th and 9th Armies had already crossed the Bug and Desna Rivers.

At 07:00, Bock flew from Posen to an advance airfield near the headquarters of XIII Infantry Corps. There, Major General Erich Jaschke gave Bock a summary of the progress of the invasion. Following this meeting, Bock visited Guderian's forward command post at Bokhaly. Bock then visited Joachim Lemelsen, who gave a report from the front. The roads on the Soviet side of the Bug River were already becoming too soft to support the weight of tanks. Despite this, the first day of the invasion had been spectacularly successful. Soviet resistance was reported as being light and complete surprise was achieved. All along the front rapid progress was being made.

On the second day of Barbarossa, Bock crossed the Bug River escorted by Major General Gustav Schmidt. Later that day Bock was presented with reports that Soviet resistance was stiffening all along the front, especially on Guderian's southern flank. 
Meanwhile, Hoth's forces were advancing with much more ease through the Baltic states and Belarus. The first two days of Army Group Center's advance proved to be highly successful. 

Hoth's army advanced so quickly that Bock immediately contacted Walter von Brauchitsch, requesting the bypassing of Minsk in favour of attacking toward Vitebsk so that a drive could be made for Moscow. Initially, the change in plan was accepted but it was soon overruled by Hitler, who favoured the encirclement and destruction of the large Soviet armies near Minsk. Bock wrote in his diary:

Differences between Bock's strategic intent and the intent of High Command repeatedly surfaced. Bock continued to favour a direct drive toward Moscow, bypassing Soviet armies and leaving them to be destroyed by infantry, which advanced on foot, well behind tank columns. Bock argued that if encirclement were truly necessary then instead of diverting his tanks north and south to encircle and destroy smaller Soviet armies, a larger encirclement should be made eastward toward the Dvina-Dnieper River basins.

Hitler decided against this plan, and insisted that the pockets containing Soviet armies must be destroyed before advancing deeper into Russia. Bock, enraged by this decision, was quoted as saying: "We are permitting our greatest chance of success to escape us by this restriction placed on our armour!"

He hesitantly gave the order to abandon the drive toward Vitebsk and assist in the destruction of the pockets. On 30 June, the 4th and 9th Armies met each other near Slonim, trapping thousands of Soviet soldiers. However, many Soviet soldiers managed to escape eastward. Bock soon gave the order to disengage from the encirclement and prepare for a full-scale drive to the east. This order once again caused a confrontation between Bock and Brauchitsch.

On 3 July, Bock's forces were once again advancing eastward, with Guderian's tanks crossing the Berezina and Hoth's tanks crossing the Duna. This day marked the furthest distance covered by Bock's troops in a single day, with over  travelled. Four days later, Guderian's tanks crossed the Dnieper, the last great obstacle before Smolensk. However, Guderian was soon ordered by Günther von Kluge to withdraw back across the river. Bock soon reversed this order, and Guderian was allowed to re-cross the river. Bock protested Kluge's actions to High Command, to no avail. On 11 July, Bock moved his headquarters again to Borisov, a Soviet town near the Berezina River.

March on Moscow

On 9 September, Army High Command instructed Bock to prepare an operational order for the assault on Moscow. Operation Typhoon was the code-name given to this new attack, which was to begin no later than 30 September. Bock supervised the planning and preparation of the operation, and a few days later it was approved by the High Command.

As part of the preparation for Operation Typhoon, Army Group Center would be reinforced and replenished with men and vehicles; it would be composed of three infantry armies (the 2nd, 4th, and 9th) and three tank armies (2nd, 3rd, and 4th Panzers). Colonel General Erich Hoepner would command the 4th Panzer Army, while the former two were outgrowths of Hoth's and Guderian's original Panzer Groups. The replenishment of Army Group Center for Operation Typhoon caused it to increase greatly in size: with almost 1.5 million soldiers, it was now larger than it was at the outset of Operation Barbarossa. Bock spent most of the remainder of September on inspection tours of his reinforced Army Group Center. On one occasion, Bock—along with Albert Kesselring—flew over Moscow.

On 29 September, Bock held a conference with his senior commanders Strauss, Hoth, Kluge, Weichs, Hoepner, Guderian, and Kesselring. During the meeting the main operational plan was reviewed, with Bock again stressing that Moscow must be taken by 7 November, before the onset of winter, and to coincide with the anniversary of the Russian Revolution. The following day, Operation Typhoon began with attacks from Guderian's and Hoth's armored forces. Several days later, the infantry armies began to move toward Moscow. With less than 150 km between the most advanced troops and Moscow, Bock estimated that his troops would enter the city in three to four weeks. Almost immediately, Bock's forces encountered stiff Soviet resistance on the road to Moscow.

The 2nd Panzer Army—along with the XLVIII Panzer Corps—attacked important rail junctions near Oryol (Orel) and Bryansk. Hoepner's 4th Panzer Army soon crossed the Desna River and gained access to deep Russian territory. Meanwhile, Hoth's 3rd Panzer Army struck toward Rzhev on the Volga River.

Meanwhile, elements of the 2nd Panzer Army reported that they had bypassed Bryansk and were heading toward Karachev. Bock ordered Guderian to press on toward Tula, but within hours this order had been reversed by High Command. The reversal of the order called for Guderian to attack Bryansk where—along with Vyazma—two massive encirclements of Soviet forces were occurring. Bock argued that the area between Orel and Tula remained relatively free of Soviet forces and that Tula could be captured within hours. Ultimately, Bock agreed to divert Guderian's tanks toward Bryansk.

Cold rain soon began to fall over the northern sectors of Army Group Center's front, and the roads soon turned into quagmires as part of the Rasputitsa. Virtually the entire front became stuck; the only vehicles capable of negotiating the mud were tanks and other tracked vehicles. This further aggravated the problem of already poor supply lines.

Slight improvements in the weather soon made it possible for Bock's forces to continue to seal the pockets around Bryansk and Vyazma. The dual encirclements of Soviet forces around Vyazma and Bryansk yielded some of the largest Soviet casualties since the beginning of Operation Barbarossa: some 650,000 prisoners were taken during these two encirclements, after which the Soviet armies facing Bock's Army Group Center no longer had the advantage of superior numbers. Bock was one of the few German officers to protest the systematic maltreatment of Soviet prisoners of war, but took few steps to improve the conditions of those being held in the areas under his command.

The weather soon deteriorated again, with the roads once more turning into impassable, muddy quagmires. Since 30 September, Bock had lost some 35,000 men, 250 tanks and artillery pieces, and several hundred other vehicles, many of which were mired in the mud. Fuel and ammunition supplies became dangerously low. Despite these problems, the advance toward Moscow continued as Hitler became increasingly impatient. When advance units of the 4th Panzer Army reached Kaluga and Maloyaroslavets, German forces were within  of Moscow. Guderian's advance in the south was much slower. An attempt by his forces to capture Tula had failed, with considerable losses of men and tanks. However, other units captured Stalinogorsk and Venev, indicating the possibility of bypassing Tula.

As Bock's forces smashed through the Red Army defense lines at Mozhaisk in mid-October, panic struck in the capital. Hundreds of thousands of civilians began to evacuate the city while others were forced into emergency volunteer units. Martial law was instituted as looting and pillaging of deserted stores increased. Marshal Semyon Timoshenko was relieved of command in favor of Georgy Zhukov, who had been organizing the defense of Leningrad.

The further Bock's forces advanced, the stiffer Soviet resistance became. The paved roads leading to Moscow became craters under constant Russian artillery fire, rendering them impassable. This forced the German troops into the mud and Army Group Center soon became stuck once again. The goal of capturing Moscow by mid-October could no longer be achieved. However, the sheer weight of the German advance could not be fully stopped, and on 21 October units of the 9th Army captured Kalinin.

As November arrived the mud soon turned into ice as temperatures dropped to −28 °C (−20 °F). While the ground hardened sufficiently enough to support vehicles, the cold weather added to the miseries of the German soldiers as many had not received winter clothing. Frostbite soon took its toll; many soldiers were severely affected and had to be evacuated.

On 20 November, Bock moved his field headquarters to an advanced forward position near the front lines. There he visited an artillery command post, where he could see the buildings of Moscow through his field glasses. Several days later, German forces crossed the Moscow-Volga Canal and reached Khimki but soon fell back due to Soviet resistance. On 29 November, elements of the 4th Panzer Army reached the western suburbs of Moscow. On 4 December, units of the 2nd Army reached Kuntsevo, a western suburb of Moscow. Several units of Guderian's army bypassed Kolomna and reached the Moscow River. Meanwhile, the 3rd Panzer Army once again fought into Khimki. These were the last advances made by Army Group Center under Bock's command.

On 6 December, with the temperature at −45 °C (−50 °F), fresh Russian troops commanded by Zhukov launched a huge counterattack. All along the front near Moscow German troops retreated, destroying whatever equipment they could not salvage. Several days later, High Command ordered a halt to all offensive operations. Bock wrote in his diary:

On 18 December, Bock was relieved of his command of Army Group Center. The official pretext of this decision was health problems. However, this was just one case out of some 40 high-ranking officers being relieved of their command following the failure to capture Moscow.

1942 Second Battle of Kharkov and Summer Offensive, Eastern Front

He was reassigned to lead Army Group South on 20 January 1942, after the death of Generalfeldmarshall Walter von Reichenau from a stroke. Thus, in May 1942, he commanded the defending forces that delivered the devastating defeat to the Soviet winter offensive and severely depleted Soviet tank strength in the Second Battle of Kharkov. On 28 June 1942, Bock's offensive split the Russian front into fragments on either side of Kursk. Three armies (Weich's 2nd Army, Hoth's 4th Panzer, and Paulus' 6th Army)—along with 11 panzer divisions—fanned out toward Voronezh and the Don River. Paulus' armoured divisions reached the Don on either side of Voronezh on 5 July. The Soviet High Command created a Voronezh Front under Nikolai Vatutin, who reported directly to Moscow. Bock wanted to eliminate Vatutin's forces before extending his own flank too deeply into the void created by the strength and speed of the German offensive. Hitler was not pleased with Bock's plan to delay the push toward Stalingrad. On 7 July, Hitler split Army Group South into Army Groups A and B.  Army Group A was given to Field Marshal Wilhelm List to command. On 17 July, Hitler relieved Bock as commander of Army Group B, replacing him with Maximilian von Weichs. Bock never again occupied a senior command position.

1945, Death
Bock was injured on 3 May 1945, as his car was strafed by a Hawker Tempest from No. 486 Squadron RNZAF killing his wife, stepdaughter, and a friend. Initially the only survivor of the attack, Bock died of his injuries the following day. He was buried in a cemetery in Lensahn.

Awards
Order of the Crown, 4th class (Prussia, 13 September 1911)
 Iron Cross of 1914
2nd class – 18 September 1914
1st class – 30 October 1916
 Knight's Cross of the Royal House Order of Hohenzollern with Swords (25 October 1916)
 Military Merit Cross, 3rd class with war decoration (Austria-Hungary, 24 June 1915)
 Order of the Iron Crown, 3rd class with war decoration (Austria, 9 February 1917)
 Military Merit Cross, 2nd class (Mecklenburg-Schwerin, 3 August 1917)
 Hanseatic Crosses of Hamburg (19 September 1917) and Bremen (30 January 1918)
 Order of the Zähringer Lion, Knight 1st class with Swords (10 January 1918)
 Order of the Crown, Knight's Cross with Swords (Württemberg 25 January 1918)
 Pour le Mérite (1 April 1918)
 Order of Military Merit, Commander's Cross (Bulgaria, 2 August 1918)
 Service Award (1920)
 Silesian Eagle, 1st and 2nd class (15 April 1921)
 Wehrmacht Long Service Award, 1st class with 4th class; Oak Leaves added on 12 September 1939
 Anschluss Medal
 Sudetenland Medal
 Order of the Yugoslav Crown, 1st class (June 1939)
 Clasp to the Iron Cross, 1st and 2nd class (22 September 1939)
 Grand Cross of the Order of the Crown of Italy (27 August 1940)
 Order of Michael the Brave (Romania)
3rd class – 29 July 1942
1st class – September 1942
 Grand Cross of the Order of Merit of the Kingdom of Hungary with Swords (27 November 1942)
 Knight's Cross of the Iron Cross on 30 September 1939 as Generaloberst and Commander-in-Chief of Heeresgruppe Nord

See also
Corruption within the Wehrmacht

References

Sources

 Afflerbach, Holger (1996). Falkenhayn: Politisches Denken und Handeln im Kaiserreich. Munich: Oldenbourg.
 
 
 Gerbet, Klaus and Johnston, David. Generalfeldmarschall Fedor von Bock: The War Diary 1939–1945. Schiffer Publishing. 1 January 2000
 
 Horner, D. M., Jukes, Geoffrey. The Second World War: The Eastern Front 1941–1945. Osprey Publishing (25 July 2002)
 
 Mitcham, Samuel W. (2009). The Men of Barbarossa: Commanders of the German Invasion of Russia, 1941. Philadelphia: Casemate.

External links

1880 births
1945 deaths
People from Kostrzyn nad Odrą
People from the Province of Brandenburg
German Protestants
German untitled nobility
German monarchists
German Army World War II field marshals
German Army personnel of World War I
German people of Russian descent
Recipients of the Knight's Cross of the Iron Cross
Recipients of the Pour le Mérite (military class)
Recipients of the Order of Michael the Brave, 1st class
Recipients of the Hanseatic Cross (Bremen)
Commanders of the Order of Military Merit (Bulgaria)
Recipients of the Order of the Yugoslav Crown
Grand Crosses of the Order of Merit of the Republic of Hungary (military)
Prussian Army personnel
Generals of Infantry (Reichswehr)
Recipients of the clasp to the Iron Cross, 1st class
20th-century Freikorps personnel
Deaths by airstrike during World War II
Nazi war criminals